Abdelkabir El Ouadi (born 20 February 1993) is a Moroccan professional footballer who plays as a winger for Future FC.

International career
In January 2014, coach Hassan Benabicha, invited him to be a part of the Morocca squad for the 2014 African Nations Championship. He helped the team to top group B after drawing with Burkina Faso and Zimbabwe and defeating Uganda. The team was eliminated from the competition at the quarter final zone after losing to Nigeria.

References

Living people
Moroccan footballers
Morocco A' international footballers
2014 African Nations Championship players
1993 births
Raja CA players
AS FAR (football) players
Ittihad Tanger players
Wadi Degla SC players
Place of birth missing (living people)
Association football wingers
Morocco international footballers
Expatriate footballers in Egypt